is a military base of the Japan Ground Self-Defense Force in Hachinohe, Aomori Prefecture, Japan. It is one of several military facilities in eastern Aomori Prefecture, and is adjacent to the JMSDF Hachinohe Air Base.

History
Camp Hachinohe was founded as a training field for the Imperial Japanese Army Air Force in 1941. On the surrender of Japan at the end of World War II, the airfield was occupied by the 7th Cavalry Regiment and the 29th AAA AW Battalion of the United States Army as Camp Haugen, in honor of Col. Orin D. Haugen.

With the start of the Korean War in 1950, the base was turned over to the National Police Reserve, the immediate predecessor to the Japan Ground Self-Defense Force. With the final withdrawal of American forces from Hachinohe in 1956, the base was turned over to the JGSDF and was officially re-designated JGSDF Camp Hachinohe.
In 1962, the JGSDF 38th Infantry Regiment and JGSDF 39th Infantry Regiment were created at Hachinohe. The JGSDF 39th Infantry Regiment was transferred to JGSDF Camp Hirosaki in 1968 and the JGSDF 38th Infantry Regiment to JGSDF Camp Tagajō in Akita Prefecture in 1994.

In 2006, the JGSDF North Eastern Army Combined Brigade was formed, with units split between Camp Hachinohe and Camp Tagajō. At present, the base is home to 19 operational units, one aviation unit, and 2100 men.

Organization
JGSDF North East Army (HQ Sendai)
 JGSDF 4th Surface-to-Surface Missile Regiment
 JGSDF 5th Antiaircraft Artillery Group 
 JGSDF 9th Antitank Group
 JGSDF 9th Engineer Battalion(Combat)
 JGSDF North Eastern Army Aviation Group (equipped with AH-1 and OH-1 helicopters
 JGSDF 9th Logistic Support Regiment
 JGSDF 38th Infantry Regiment (portions)
 JGSDF North Eastern Army Logistic Support Troop

References

External links
 Official home page
 Photos of Camp Haugen from 1940s

Hachinohe
Hachinohe
Hachinohe